Els Dottermans (born 16 May 1964 in Leuven) is a Belgian actress of stage, film and television.

Career
Trained at Studio Herman Teirlinck in Antwerp, Dottermans has been the recipient of several film awards, including two Best Actress wins at the Joseph Plateau Awards, a Golden Calf award for Best Actress at the Nederlands Film Festival, and a Golden Goblet award for Best Actress at the Shanghai International Film Festival.

Personal life
Dottermans married Dutch actor Han Kerckhoffs and the couple has two sons.

Filmography

References

External links 

 

Flemish film actresses
Flemish stage actresses
Flemish television actresses
Living people
1964 births
Golden Calf winners
20th-century Flemish actresses
21st-century Flemish actresses
People from Leuven